Constantine X Doukas (1006–1067) was emperor of the Byzantine Empire from 1059 to 1067.

Constantine Doukas or Constantine Ducas may also refer to:
 Constantine Doukas (usurper) (died 913), Byzantine general
 Constantine Doukas (co-emperor), Byzantine co-emperor, son of Emperor Michael VII Doukas
 Constantine Doukas (died 1179), Byzantine general and governor
 Constantine Makrodoukas (died 1185), Byzantine nobleman and general
 Constantine Angelos Doukas, Byzantine usurper against Isaac II Angelos in 1193
 Constantine Komnenos Doukas, ruler of Acarnania and Aetolia from 1215 to after 1242
 Constantine Doukas of Thessaly, ruler of Thessaly from 1289 to 1303
 Constantine Ducas (Moldavian ruler), prince of Moldavia in 1693–1695 and 1700–1703